The  Asian Baseball Championship was the seventh continental tournament held by the Baseball Federation of Asia. The tournament was held in Tokyo, Japan for the second time. Won by Japan for the fifth time, it was the second of what would be three consecutive Asian Championship wins in a row; the second such sequence for Japan. The order of all teams was repeated for the first time in the tournament's history with South Korea finishing 2nd, Taiwan in 3rd and Philippines in 4th.

References

Bibliography 
 

1967
Asian Baseball Championship
Asian Baseball Championship
Asian Baseball Championship
Sports competitions in Tokyo